Yugoryonok is an urban locality (an urban-type settlement) in Ust-Maysky District of the Sakha Republic, Russia, located  from Ust-Maya, the administrative center of the district, in a highly isolated region on the right bank of the Yudoma River. As of the 2010 Census, its population was 272.

History
It was founded in 1940 at a river port on the Yudoma, for use as a service base for the nearby goldfields. With the cessation of gold mining in the 1970s, Yur was abandoned, and Yugoryonok was granted urban-type settlement status in 1978. With the cessation of mining activities in the 1990s, its population has decreased dramatically.

Geography

Climate

Administrative and municipal status
Within the framework of administrative divisions, the urban-type settlement of Yugoryonok is incorporated within Ust-Maysky District as the Settlement of Yugoryonok. As a municipal division, the Settlement of Yugoryonok is incorporated within Ust-Maysky Municipal District as Yugoryonok Urban Settlement.

Transportation
Yugoryonok is located at the end of a  road linking it with Eldikan on the Aldan River and the other gold-mining settlements in the area (now mostly abandoned). Yugoryonok was previously served by a small airport, which closed in the 1990s.

References

Notes

Sources
Official website of the Sakha Republic. Registry of the Administrative-Territorial Divisions of the Sakha Republic. Ust-Maysky District. 

Urban-type settlements in the Sakha Republic